Aleš Dolinar (born 1 June 1979) is a Slovenian  motorcycle speedway rider who was a member of Slovenia team at 2002 and 2003 Speedway World Cup.

Honours

World Championships 
 Team World Championship (Speedway World Team Cup and Speedway World Cup)
 2001 - started in Qualification only
 2002 -  - 11th place (1 pt in Event 3)
 2003 -  - 9th place (4 pts in Event 2)
 Individual U-21 World Championship
 1998 -  Piła - 18th place (1 pt)

European Championships 

 Individual U-19 European Championship
 1998 -  Krško - 6th place (9 pts)
 European Club Champions' Cup
 1998 - 2nd place in Group A
 1999 - started in Group B only
 2003 -  Debrecen - 3rd place

See also 
 Slovenia national speedway team

References

External links 
 (en) (pl) Ales Dolinar at www.lubusports.pl

Slovenian speedway riders
1979 births
Living people